Yannick Haenel (born 1967, Rennes) is a French writer, cofounder of the literary magazine .

Biography 
The son of a soldier, Yannick Haenel studied at the Prytanée National Militaire at La Flèche.

From 1997, he codirected the magazine Ligne de risque with François Meyronnis. Until 2005 he was a teacher of French at lycée La Bruyère in Versailles.

He published several novels, including Introduction à la mort française and Évoluer parmi les avalanches, as well as an essay about the tapestries of The Lady and the Unicorn: À mon seul désir.

He also directed two volumes of interviews with Philippe Sollers: Ligne de risque and Poker.

In 2007, he published Cercle (Éditions Gallimard), a novel which earned him the prix Décembre and the prix Roger Nimier.

In 2007, a controversy arose with Alina Reyes who accused him of plagiarism.

In 2008-2009, Haenel was a resident at the French Academy in Rome, the Villa Médicis.

In 2009, he was awarded the Prix Interallié and the Prix du roman Fnac for .This book has three parts:
 The first part is directly inspired by the film  Shoah  by Claude Lanzmann, where the Polish resistant Karski is interviewed.
 The second part summarizes in approximately 80 pages the testimony of Karski published in English in 1944 under the title Story of a secret state.
 The third part depicts Karski's feelings and relates dialogues that are presented by the author as a fiction.

Claude Lanzmann published a vigorous criticism of the novel of which he described the third part as a "falsification of history". He reproached Haenel for having plagiarized the dialogues of his film without having asked for authorization. Philippe Sollers, the director of Gallimard's collection L'Infini, said that he submitted Lanzmann the prints of the novel before publication which Lanzmann has always denied. Haenel responded by claiming the freedom of the novelist

Yannick Haenel is a columnist for the literary and film magazine  since 2010 and Charlie Hebdo since the resumption of publication after the January 2015 attacks.

Work

Novels 
1996: Les Petits Soldats, La Table ronde
2001: Introduction à la mort française, Gallimard, series "L'Infini"
2003: Évoluer parmi les avalanches, Gallimard, series "L'Infini"
2007: Cercle, Gallimard, series "L'Infini", Prix Décembre 2007, prix Roger Nimier 2008.
2009: Jan Karski, Gallimard, series "L'Infini", 2009 , Prix du roman Fnac and Prix Interallié.
2013: Les Renards pâles, Gallimard, series "L'Infini" 
2017 Tiens ferme ta couronne, Gallimard, series "L'Infini" 
Prix Médicis of 2017

Fictions 
2005: À mon seul désir, 
2011: Le Sens du calme, Mercure de France, series "Traits et portraits"
2015: Je cherche l'Italie, Gallimard, series "L'Infini"

Essay 
2009: Prélude à la délivrance, with François Meyronnis, Gallimard, series "L'Infini"

Interviews 
2005: Ligne de risque, under the direction of Yannick Haenel and François Meyronnis, Gallimard, series "L'Infini"
2005: Poker, entretiens de la revue Ligne de risque with Philippe Sollers, Gallimard, series "L'Infini"

Honours 
 2010 Chevalier of the Ordre des Arts et des Lettres
 2012 Chevalier of the Order of Merit of the Republic of Poland
 2017 Prix Médicis for Tiens ferme ta couronne

References

External links 
 Tilmann Krause: "Die Henker interessieren mich nicht", in: Die Welt vom 26. April 2010
 Yannick Haenel on France Culture
 Yannick Haenel - Les renards pâles on YouTube

21st-century French non-fiction writers
Prix Décembre winners
Prix Interallié winners
Roger Nimier Prize winners
Chevaliers of the Ordre des Arts et des Lettres
Writers from Rennes
1967 births
Living people
Prix Médicis winners